is the fifth single by Japanese idol duo Wink. Written by Neko Oikawa and Masaya Ozeki, the single was released on July 5, 1989 by Polystar Records.

Background and release 
"Samishii Nettaigyo" was first used by Panasonic for their S-Type headphone commercial featuring Wink in mid-April 1989. The B-side is a Japanese-language cover of the Hedy West song "500 Miles".

"Samishii Nettaigyo" became Wink's third No. 1 on the Oricon's weekly charts. It sold over 564,000 copies and was certified Platinum by the RIAJ. The song won the Grand Prix award at the 31st Japan Record Awards. In addition, it led to the duo's first and only appearance on NHK's Kōhaku Uta Gassen in 1989.

Track listing 
All lyrics are written by Neko Oikawa; all music is arranged by Motoki Funayama.

Chart positions 
Weekly charts

Year-end charts

Certifications

Cover versions 
 In 1990, the song was covered in Chinese Mandarin by Xiao Hu Dui as "Xing Xing De Yue Hui" (星星的約會) on their cover album of the same name.
 In 1991, the song was covered in English by The Nolans as "Tidal Wave" on their cover album Tidal Wave (Samishii Nettaigyo).
 In 2004, the song was covered by W on their debut album Duo U&U.
 In 2004, the song was covered by Nana Katase on her album Extended
 In 2005, the song was performed by ex-Morning Musume member Kaori Iida and Ruca at Flet's (フレッツ) Casual Dinner Show.
 In 2008, the song was covered by Kimiko Koyama for the anime Rosario + Vampire.
 In 2010, the song was covered by MAX on their 2010 cover album Be MAX.
 In 2017, the song was covered by FEMM on their album 80's/90's J-Pop Revival.
 In 2012, the song was covered by You Kikkawa on her 2012 cover album Vocalist?.
 In 2012, the song was covered in English by Janet Kay on her 2012 cover album Idol Kay.
 In 2019, the song was covered by Kazehikaru Fukurou (風光ル梟), as their second single.
 In 2019, the song was performed by Red Velvet members Joy and Yeri as a Special Stage at SMTOWN in Tokyo.
 In 2020, the song was parodied by Kyoko Fukada, Mikako Tabe, and Mei Nagano in a UQ Mobile commercial.

References

External links 
 
 

1989 singles
1989 songs
Wink (duo) songs
Japanese-language songs
Songs with lyrics by Neko Oikawa
Compositions in A minor
Oricon Weekly number-one singles